Candle in the Tomb  is a 2016 Chinese streaming television series based on the novel Ghost Blows Out the Light. It is directed by Kong Sheng, produced by Hou Hongliang and stars Jin Dong, Joe Chen and Zhao Da. It tells the story of a gang of tomb raiders as they go on adventures and unearth the truth behind a mysterious curse. The drama aired 3 episodes every Monday at 20:00 on Tencent Video from 19 December 2016.

The series received acclaim for its exciting and fast-paced storyline, actors' performance as well as staying true to the novel. It surpassed 200 million views in one day  and has over 1.6 billion views in total.

Plot
A former soldier named Hu Bayi meets an old comrade, Wang Kaixuan and ekes out a living by reselling cassette tapes. While helping Wang retrieve a piece of jade from an antiques merchant nicknamed Big Golden Tooth. During the faceoff, Hu's heirloom compass that belonged to a long lineage of tomb raiders was noticed by Big Golden Tooth and Hu and Wang were persuaded to explore the possibility of an alternative job by reselling unearthing antiques as tomb raiders. They later join an archaeological team sponsored by Shirley Yang to find the location of a mysterious ancient city of Jingjue in a desert region, stopping by the Kunlun glaciers and braving the black sandstorms in the process.

Cast

Awards and nominations

References

External links

Ghost Blows Out the Light
2016 Chinese television series debuts
Television series by Daylight Entertainment
Chinese web series
Tencent original programming
Television series by Tencent Penguin Pictures
2016 web series debuts